In enzymology, a methylamine-glutamate N-methyltransferase is an enzyme that catalyzes the chemical reaction

methylamine + -glutamate  NH3 + N-methyl--glutamate

Thus, the two substrates of this enzyme are methylamine and -glutamate, whereas its two products are NH3 and N-methyl--glutamate.

This enzyme belongs to the family of transferases, specifically those transferring one-carbon group methyltransferases.  The systematic name of this enzyme class is methylamine:-glutamate N-methyltransferase. Other names in common use include N-methylglutamate synthase, and methylamine-glutamate methyltransferase.  This enzyme participates in methane metabolism.

References

 

EC 2.1.1
Enzymes of unknown structure